Seán MacManus is an Irish Sinn Féin politician, and was the national chairperson of the party from 1984 to 1990.

Background
MacManus was born in 1950 near Blacklion, County Cavan, Ireland and moved to London in the 1960s to find work. There he met and married Helen McGovern, a native of Glenfarne, County Leitrim. In 1976, he returned to Ireland and settled in the Maugheraboy area of Sligo town, County Sligo so that their family of two boys could be educated in Ireland.

Still based in Maugheraboy, MacManus has been involved in Irish Republican politics since the early 1970s and was secretary of the County Sligo Anti-H-Block Committee which campaigned in support of the republican prisoners hunger strikes of 1980/81. He became a member of the Sinn Féin Ard Comhairle (National Executive) in 1982 and remained there for over twenty years. MacManus was elected as the first Sinn Féin National Chairperson from 1984 until 1990. After the IRA ceasefire in 1994 MacManus was part of the first Sinn Féin delegation to meet with the British government in over seventy years. He was also involved in the protracted negotiations leading to the Good Friday Agreement.

First elected to Sligo Corporation (now Sligo Borough Council) in 1994 he has remained until its abolition in May 2014. He was also elected to Sligo County Council in 1999 and was re-elected in 2004, 2009 and 2014. He stepped down from elected politics in February 2017 been replaced by his son Chris MacManus.

In 2000, MacManus became Mayor of Sligo, the first Sinn Féin Mayor in the Republic of Ireland since the beginning of The Troubles in 1969. He was also elected mayor in 2003.

Republican family
MacManus has two sons. Chris MacManus, the youngest, was also an elected member of Sligo Borough Council (1999–2014) and Sligo County Council (2017–2020); and is an MEP since March 2020. His eldest son, Joseph MacManus, was an IRA volunteer who was killed in a firefight against an off-duty UDR soldier in Belleek, County Fermanagh in February 1992.

References

Further reading
 Brian Feeney, Sinn Féin: A Hundred Turbulent Years (2003) HB:  PB

External links
List of Mayors of Sligo
Seán MacManus' electoral history (ElectionsIreland.org)
Sligo Sinn Féin official website

1950 births
Living people
Mayors of places in the Republic of Ireland
People from Sligo (town)
Politicians from County Sligo
Politicians from County Cavan
Local councillors in County Sligo
Sinn Féin politicians